Pimmit Hills is a census-designated place (CDP) in Fairfax County, Virginia, United States. The population was 6,094 at the 2010 census. In practical terms, it is more of a neighborhood within a densely populated urban area than a traditional town.

It is found within the triangle made by the intersection of three highways: Interstate 495 (the Capital Beltway), Interstate 66, and State Route 267 (the Dulles Toll Road). Within this triangle, the actual bounds of the neighborhood are Pimmit Run, Leesburg Pike (State Route 7), and Magarity Road. Although Pimmit Hills is politically part of Fairfax County, Pimmit Hills addresses use Falls Church as their mailing address.

History

The area that is now Pimmit Hills was primarily farm land until the sub-division was built beginning in 1950. The houses in Pimmit Hills were mostly built during the 1950s for World War II and Korean War veterans and their families. Most of the houses were originally built as three bedroom, one bath dwellings of 833 square feet. Their initial price in 1950 was $9,950. George Offutt began construction of the first 500 Pimmit Hills houses in 1950. His Offutt Construction Company completed the first two sections by 1954. Other builders completed sections 3-6, while Offutt built sections 7 & 8 under a different company. The subdivision was fully built out by 1957-58, with 1675 homes on 663 acres. When the homes were first built, many areas were treeless, having been farm fields previously. However, decades later the area is known for its population of large oaks, Tulip trees and other trees.

Current real estate values mirror the rest of Northern Virginia, with extreme value appreciation within the last several years. Like most of the rest of Northern Virginia, the ethnic mix in the neighborhood is quite varied. According to real estate site redfin.com, the median sale price of a Pimmit Hills home was $853,000 in June, 2021, reflecting the large number of larger, new homes that replaced the original 1950s homes.

Several attempts have been made by commercial developers to buy up Pimmit properties and convert them to higher-density housing such as condominiums or town houses, but so far these have been resisted by homeowners and the comprehensive redevelopment plans for the Tysons area contemplates the preservation of the neighborhood as a community of single-family homes. Add-ons to the original houses such as second floors, basements, and same-floor expansions are common. The neighborhood is currently seeing many new homes built and on any given block one can find several tear downs and rebuilds.  The trend on tear downs is expected to continue, although many of the homes remain older houses originally built in the mid-1950s with less than 1000 square feet.

Geography
Pimmit Hills is located at  (38.911644, −77.201321).

According to the United States Census Bureau, the CDP has a total area of 1.5 square miles (3.8 km), all of it land.

Popular culture
The trailer park in the NBC sitcom My Name Is Earl is named "Pimmit Hills Trailer Park" after the neighborhood. The series creator, Greg Garcia, lived in Pimmit Hills for a time as a child.

Demographics

As of the 2010 Census, the population was 6,094. 69.50% of the population was white, 3.70% was black, 0.90% was American Indian or Alaska Native, 0.10% were Native Hawaii or Pacific Islander, and 5.00% were two or more races. Hispanic or Latinos of any race were 19.90% of the population.
The U.S. Census Bureau listed these statistics 1 April 2020:
Age and Sex	
Persons under 5 years	   9.2%;
Persons under 18 years	  23.0%;
Persons 65 years and over 11.6%;
Female persons 51%;
Race and Hispanic Origin:	
White alone 59.0%;
Black or African American alone 1.0%;
American Indian and Alaska Native alone 0.1%;
Asian alone 23.8%;
Native Hawaiian and Other Pacific Islander alone 0.0%;
Two or More Races 1.9%;
Hispanic or Latino 22.3%;
White alone, not Hispanic or Latino 49.8%;
Population Characteristics:	
Veterans, 2015-2019	429;
Foreign born persons, 2015-2019	41.7%.

Education
Fairfax County Public Schools operates public schools.

Fairfax County Public Library operates the Tysons-Pimmit Regional Library in the Pimmit Hills CDP, serving Pimmit Hills and Tysons Corner.

References

External links

 Pimmit Hills Citizens Association
 Pimmit Hills i-Neighbor site

Census-designated places in Fairfax County, Virginia
Census-designated places in Virginia
Washington metropolitan area